Ashes and Madness is the second album released by Danish power metal band Avian. It was released on 30 September 2008 in North America and to the rest of the world in January 2009 via Nightmare Records.

Track listing 
All tracks written by Yan Leviathan.

 "Ashes and Madness" − 7:32
 "The Lost and Forsaken" − 5:08
 "Into the Other Side" − 4:38
 "Esoteric Lies" − 5:17
 "Fall from Grace" (instrumental) − 1:11
 "Beyond the Hallowed Gates" − 5:00
 "Thundersoul" − 5:03
 "All the King's Horses" − 5:11
 "Never Fade from Me" − 5:24
 "Time and Space Part II: Unlock the Mystery" − 10:14

Personnel 
Jerry Babcock – drums
Bill Hudson – guitar
Abby King – voices
Lance King – keyboards, vocals, producer, engineer, mastering, mixing, audio production, audio engineer
Tomy King – violin
Yan Leviathan – acoustic guitar, guitar, bass, rhythm guitar, engineer, audio engineer
Mattias Norén – artwork, cover art, layout

External links 
 Official band website
 Nightmare Records

Avian (band) albums
2008 albums